The 1991 DFB-Pokal Final decided the winner of the 1990–91 DFB-Pokal, the 48th season of Germany's premier knockout football cup competition. It was played on 22 June 1991 at the Olympiastadion in Berlin. Werder Bremen won the match 4–3 on penalties against 1. FC Köln, following a 1–1 draw after extra time, to claim their second cup title.

Route to the final
The DFB-Pokal began with 64 teams in a single-elimination knockout cup competition. There were a total of five rounds leading up to the final. Teams were drawn against each other, and the winner after 90 minutes would advance. If still tied, 30 minutes of extra time was played. If the score was still level, a replay would take place at the original away team's stadium. If still level after 90 minutes, 30 minutes of extra time was played. If the score was still level, a drawing of lots would decide who would advance to the next round.

Note: In all results below, the score of the finalist is given first (H: home; A: away).

Match

Details

References

External links
 Match report at kicker.de 
 Match report at WorldFootball.net
 Match report at Fussballdaten.de 

SV Werder Bremen matches
1. FC Köln matches
1990–91 in German football cups
1991
June 1991 sports events in Europe
1991 in Berlin
Football competitions in Berlin
Association football penalty shoot-outs